The football competition at the 2014 Summer Youth Olympics took place at the Wutaishan Stadium and the Jiangning Sports Center, both located in Nanjing, China, between 14–27 August 2014. There were two tournaments, one for boys and one for girls. Players must be 15 years old (born between 1 January and 31 December 1999) to be eligible to participate.

Each match lasted 80 minutes, consisting of two periods of 40 minutes, with an interval of 15 minutes.

Participating teams
One team from each continental confederation participated in each tournament. The same country may not participate in both the boys' and girls' tournament. As hosts, China was given Asia's spot to compete in the girls' tournament (and thus could not participate in the boys' tournament). Teams may qualify through preliminary competitions, or be nominated for participation by their confederation, with the invited teams ratified by FIFA during their meeting in Zürich on 3–4 October 2013.

Schedule
On each day two matches were played.

All times are CST (UTC+8)

Medal summary

References

External links
Official Results Book – Football
Boys' Youth Olympic Football Tournament Nanjing 2014 , FIFA.com
Girls' Youth Olympic Football Tournament Nanjing 2014 , FIFA.com

 
Football
2014
Summer Youth Olympics
2014